Time Waits: The Amazing Bud Powell (Vol. 4), also known as The Amazing Bud Powell, Vol. 4: Time Waits, is a studio album by jazz pianist Bud Powell, released on Blue Note Records in 1958, featuring a session Powell recorded at the Van Gelder Studio in Hackensack, New Jersey on May 24, 1958, with Sam Jones on bass and Philly Joe Jones on drums. The title track, a version of the Mexican popular song "Duerme", was recorded by Powell in 1954 for Verve, and in 1956 for RCA, under its original English-language title "Time Was".

The album was remastered in 1999 by Rudy Van Gelder and re-issued as part of Blue Note's RVG Edition series.

Track listing
All songs composed by Bud Powell, except as noted.
"Buster Rides Again" – 5:30
"Sub City" – 4:32
"Time Waits" – 5:06 (Miguel Prado, Gabriel Luna, Bob Russell, better-known as "Time Was")
"Marmalade" – 4:28
"Monopoly" – 4:47
"John's Abbey" – 5:36
"Dry Soul" – 6:41
"Sub City" [alternate take] – 2:36
"John's Abbey" [alternate take] – 2:25 (not on original LP)

Personnel

Performance
Bud Powell – piano
Sam Jones – bass
Philly Joe Jones – drums

Production
Bob Blumenthal – liner notes
Leonard Feather – liner notes (original LP)
Alfred Lion – (original) producer
Reid Miles – cover design
Rudy Van Gelder – recording engineer
Francis Wolff – photography, cover photo

References

Blue Note BLP 1598
Bud Powell at jazzdisco.org
Time Waits,... at BlueNote.com

Bud Powell albums
1958 albums
Albums produced by Alfred Lion
Blue Note Records albums
Albums recorded at Van Gelder Studio
Sequel albums